Bill Mason (1929–1988) was a Canadian naturalist and canoeist

Bill Mason may also refer to:
 Bill Mason (footballer) (1908–1995), English football goalkeeper
 Bill Mason (director) (1915–2002), British documentary film maker and amateur race driver
 Bill Mason (jewel thief) (born 1940), American jewel thief
 Bill Mason (rowing coach) (born 1950), former British Olympic rower and coach

See also
 William Mason (disambiguation)